Church of Saint Mary in Višnieŭ is a Catholic parish church in Minsk, Belarus. It was constructed in 1637–1641 on the banks of  river. The church is listed as a Belarus Cultural Heritage object.

History 

The first Catholic parish in Vishnyeva was established in the 15th century by Vytautas the Great, in 1424 a wooden church was built by Petras Gedgaudas. The stone church was constructed in 1637–1641 on donations of Nowogródek Voivoda  and consecrated in honor of the Visitation. After his death, Jerzy Chreptowicz was buried in the church's crypt.

In 1771 the church was restored after fire on donations of the philanthropist . In that period two sacristies were added to the altar part.

In 1906 the church was reconstructed again, a narthex and two square-shaped towers were added to the main building. The interiors were painted by the Polish artist Ferdynand Ruszczyc

Unlike the majority of the churches of the former Russian Empire, the Church of Saint Mary in Vishnyeva was not closed during the Soviet times.

Gallery

References

Sources 
 

Churches in Belarus
Landmarks in Belarus